Robert Stickgold is a full professor of psychiatry at the Harvard Medical School and the Beth Israel Deaconess Medical Center.  A sleep researcher, his work focuses on the relationship between sleep and learning. His articles in the popular press are intended to illustrate the dangers of sleep deprivation.

Stickgold was born in Chicago. He graduated from Harvard University before attending the University of Wisconsin–Madison, where he received his doctorate in biochemistry. He worked with the sleep researcher J. Allan Hobson for many years and has been known to quote Hobson's quip: "The only known function of sleep is to cure sleepiness". Stickgold's research has focused on sleep and cognition, dreaming, and conscious states. He has been a proponent of the role of sleep in memory consolidation. Additional research has focused on dreaming. In one experiment, participants played the computer game Tetris for three days and reported dreaming about falling geometric shapes—a phenomenon now known as the Tetris effect. Even patients with anterograde amnesia, who did not remember playing the game, had similar dreams as normal participants. Similar results were found in another study utilizing the video game Alpine Racer 2.  Participants reported dreaming about skiing.

Stickgold lives in Cambridge, Massachusetts and has four children.

Dr. Stickgold is also a published science fiction author. In 1973 Robert "Bob" Stickgold had his novelette "Susies Reality" published in the May/June issue of "Worlds of IF Science Fiction" anthology magazine. With Mark Noble, they wrote "Gloryhits" in 1978. And in 1979 "Bob" created "our children will be mutants". And then in 1981 "The California Coven Project" was published.

References

External links
 Robert Stickgold, Faculty profile, Harvard Medical School
 PBS' NOVA episode "What Are Dreams?" Video & Transcript
 Internet Archive of "Susies Reality" in IF magazine

Living people
Sleep researchers
Oneirologists
Harvard Medical School faculty
Harvard University alumni
University of Wisconsin–Madison College of Letters and Science alumni
1945 births
American psychiatrists